Massaman curry is a rich, flavourful, and mildly spicy Thai curry. It is a fusion dish, combining ingredients from three sources: Persia, the Indian Subcontinent, and the Malay Archipelago (e.g., cardamom, cinnamon, cloves, star anise, cumin, bay leaves, nutmeg, and mace) with ingredients more commonly used in native Thai cuisine (e.g., chili peppers, coriander, lemongrass, galangal, white pepper, shrimp paste, shallots, and garlic) to make massaman curry paste. The substance of the dish is usually based on chicken or other meat, potatoes, onions, and peanuts. The richness comes from the coconut milk and cream used as a base, as for many Thai curries.

In 2011, CNNGo ranked massaman curry as the number one most delicious food in an article titled "World's 50 most delicious foods". However, by a reader's survey, it ranked number ten. It remained at number one in the official, updated 2018 version.

Description
Due to its Muslim roots and therefore Islamic dietary laws, this curry is most commonly made with chicken, but there are also variations on this dish using duck, beef, venison, mutton, goat, or, less commonly, pork. As pork is haram (forbidden) in Islam, this last variant is not eaten by observant Thai Muslims. Vegetarians and vegans have created their own versions of this dish, such as using tofu and substituting any shrimp paste or fish sauce used.

The Muslim roots of the dish are evident in many of the flavors of the massaman curry paste (nam phrik kaeng matsaman) that come from spices not frequently used in other Thai curries. Cardamom, cinnamon, cloves,  star anise, cumin, bay leaves, nutmeg and mace would, in the 17th century, have been brought to Thailand from the Malay Archipelago and South Asia by foreigners, a trade originally dominated by Muslim traders from the Middle East, Indian subcontinent, and from the archipelago itself, but increasingly undertaken by the Portuguese, the Dutch, and the French East India Company. 

These foreign spices and flavors are then combined with local produce and flavors commonly used in native Thai cuisine such as dried chili peppers, cilantro (coriander) seeds, lemongrass, galangal, white pepper, shrimp paste, shallots, and garlic to make the massaman curry paste.

The curry paste is first fried with coconut cream, and only then are meat, potatoes, onions, fish sauce or salt, tamarind paste, sugar, coconut milk and peanuts added. Massaman is usually eaten with rice together in a meal with other dishes. There are also traditional versions using oranges, orange juice, or pineapple juice as additional ingredients.

History

The name massaman is a corruption of the term mosalman, an archaic word derived from Persian, meaning "Muslim". Hence, many earlier writers from the mid-19th century called the dish "Mussulman curry".

According to Thai journalist and scholar Santi Sawetwimon, as well as Thai food expert David Thompson, the dish originated in 17th century central Thailand at the cosmopolitan court of Ayutthaya, through the Persian merchant Sheik Ahmad Qomi, from whom the noble Thai Bunnag family descends. Most theories contend that massaman is a southern Thai dish influenced by Malay and Indian cuisine.

The curry is extolled in the poem Kap He Chom Khrueang Khao Wan from the end of the 18th century, attributed to Prince Itsarasunthon of Siam (now Thailand), the later King Rama II (1767-1824). It is dedicated to a lady who is thought to be Princess Bunrot, the later Queen Sri Suriyendra, wife of King Rama II. The second stanza of the poem reads:

The first-ever recorded recipe for massaman curry by Lady Plean Passakornrawong in 1889: "Chicken Massaman curry with bitter orange juice", with Massaman spelled Matsaman (หมัดสมั่น). By 2002 it was being included in Australian recipe books as "Musaman beef curry"

Politics
According to Time Magazine, Massaman curry is rated the food most disproportionately preferred by voters who vote for candidates of the Democratic Party.

See also

 Rendang
 Kaeng hang le
 Thai curry
 Thai cuisine
 List of Thai dishes
 List of Thai ingredients

References

Thai curries